Gergely Tumma (born 10 February 2000) is a Slovak footballer who plays for Tatran Liptovský Mikuláš, on loan from Spartak Trnava, as a centre back.

Honours
Spartak Trnava
Slovnaft Cup: 2021–22

References

External links
 
 Futbalnet profile 
 

2000 births
Living people
People from Galanta
Sportspeople from the Trnava Region
Slovak footballers
Slovakia youth international footballers
Slovakia under-21 international footballers
Association football defenders
FC Spartak Trnava players
FC Košice (2018) players
2. Liga (Slovakia) players
Slovak Super Liga players